Guerilla is a board wargame published by Maplay Games in 1974 that provides a tactical simulation of guerilla combat on Borneo during the Indonesia–Malaysia confrontation of the early 1960s.

Background
In 1962, Indonesia objected to the creation of the Federation of Malaysia, and an undeclared guerilla war broke out between the two countries.

Description
Guerilla is a two-player game at the tactical level in which one player controls Gurkha forces fighting for Malaysia, while the other player controls Indonesian forces.

Components
The game includes:
 25" x 29" paper hex grid map scaled at 1.2 km (0.75 mi) per hex 
 555  (uncut) paper counters
 18-page typewritten rules booklet
Ground Effects card
small six-sided die

Gameplay
In addition to the usual rules for movement and combat, there are also provisions for secret victory conditions, ambushes, infiltration, hidden guerilla units, canoes, helicopters and the construction of chopper-pads in villages.

Publication history
Guerilla was published by the British games company Maplay Games in 1974, packaged in an envelope. The designer and rulebook cover artist are uncredited. Maplay went on to publish one more game in 1976, a Napoleonic wargame titled Salamanca, before it went out of business.

Reception
In the 1977 book The Comprehensive Guide to Board Wargaming, game critic Charles Vasey complimented "A large map and neat counters." He concluded, "Great attention to detail, but supply rules [are] odd; movement uses a rather old-fashioned method." 

In Issue 11 of Simulacrum, Joe Scolari noted the unusual and possibly unique setting, saying, "Games like Guerilla are a breath of fresh air for wargamers tired of endlessly recycled topics like Gettysburg, D-Day and the Bulge." Scolari pointed out that in 1974, Guerillas small platoon-sized combats "had few peers when published since there were only a handful of games at that time using squad level units." He admitted the components were not well-produced but thought the game was still good, saying, "While Guerilla is rough around the edges (including some amateur production values), the design itself shows quite a bit of creativity. This is especially true in comparison to its squad level contemporaries. Even today it is possibly (albeit by default) the definitive tactical treatment of the conflict."

References

Board wargames set in Modern history
Wargames introduced in 1974